An Oral/Visual History by the Red Hot Chili Peppers is a book written by the Red Hot Chili Peppers along with Brendan Mullen, who died during the writing of the book. This is the only officially released book dedicated to the rock band.

Background
Many books have been released throughout the band's career, which started in 1983; however, this is the first and only official book to be authorized by the band themselves. It contains interviews with many of the then present and past band members, friends, family and others discussing the band's legacy. The book contains hundreds of photographs and images, some never seen by the band's fans before. It was one of the final projects the band worked on with guitarist John Frusciante before he quit the band in 2009 and concludes with a write-up by lead singer Anthony Kiedis on the guitarist, his departure and the band's future. Brendan Mullen, a Los Angeles club promoter and the man who gave the band their start, died during the writing of the book, leaving others to complete the project.

References

External links

2010 non-fiction books
Music autobiographies